Siemion Fajtlowicz is a Polish-American mathematician, formerly a professor at the University of Houston. He is known for creating and developing the conjecture-making computer program Graffiti.

Fajtlowicz received his Ph.D. in 1967 or 1968 from the Institute of Mathematics of the Polish Academy of Sciences, under the supervision of Edward Marczewski.

References

External links
 Siemion Fajtlowicz at Graph Theory White Pages
 Archived copy of home page at UH

Year of birth missing (living people)
Living people
20th-century Polish mathematicians
21st-century Polish mathematicians
Graph theorists